Tenotomy scissors are surgical scissors used to perform delicate surgery.  They can be straight or curved, and blunt or sharp, depending upon necessity.  This equipment can be used in many surgical specialties, in particular delicate operations in ophthalmic surgery, oral and maxillofacial surgery, or in neurosurgery.

See also
Surgical scissors
Metzenbaum scissors
Instruments used in general surgery

References 

Surgical scissors